The Forfeiture Act 1870 (33 & 34 Vict c 23) is a British Act of Parliament that abolished the automatic forfeiture of goods and land as a punishment for treason and felony. It does not apply to Scotland, which did not fully abolish forfeiture until the Criminal Justice (Scotland) Act 1949. Prior to the Act being passed, a person convicted of treason or felony automatically and permanently forfeited all of his lands and possessions to the Crown. The old offence of praemunire, which was also punished with forfeiture, was only a misdemeanour, and so the Act did not apply to it.

Although the Act is mostly repealed today, section 2 remains in force and states that anyone convicted of treason shall be disqualified from holding public office, shall lose his right to vote in elections (except in elections to local authorities), and lose his pension. (His pension can however be restored, in whole or in part, under section 70 of the Criminal Justice Act 1948.)

Section 31 of the Forfeiture Act also abolished the final incarnation of the punishment of being hanged, drawn and quartered, which had been law in various forms since ancient times.

See also
Treason Act 1814
High treason in the United Kingdom
Corruption of Blood Act 1814

Notes

References

External links

 which supplements the Forfeiture Act.

United Kingdom Acts of Parliament 1870
English criminal law
1870 in England
1870 in Wales
Acts of the Parliament of the United Kingdom concerning England and Wales